Natural killer cell granule protein 7 is a protein that in humans is encoded by the NKG7 gene.

References

Further reading 

Genes
Human proteins